Tân Thạnh is a rural commune of Giá Rai town in Bạc Liêu Province, Vietnam.

References

Communes of Bạc Liêu province
Populated places in Bạc Liêu province